The Rio Grande Valley Killer Bees were a minor league professional ice hockey team that played in the Central Hockey League. The team was based in the Rio Grande Valley in Hidalgo, Texas, just south of McAllen, and played their home games at State Farm Arena.

History
The team was a member of the Central Hockey League from 2003–2012, and two time CHL franchise of the year (2003–04 and 2008–09). Billy Newson, formerly of the Northeastern University Huskies, is the franchise's leader in goals (90), assists (102) and points (192), while Ryan Shmyr is the career leader in games played and penalty minutes. On June 28, 2011, Terry Ruskowski became the coach of the Killer Bees. He had formerly been the initial coach of the rival Laredo Bucks. Ruskowski had a two-year contract with the Bees. While in the CHL, the Killer Bees were affiliated with the Florida Panthers of the National Hockey League and the San Antonio Rampage of the American Hockey League.

On June 20, 2012, multiple sources confirmed that the Killer Bees would not play in the 2012–13 season and ceased operations due to increased travel costs after the folding of the other Texas CHL teams in Austin, Corpus Christi and Laredo.

After a season without a team, the owners of the Wenatchee Wild franchise in the North American Hockey League (NAHL), a Tier II junior A hockey league, relocated the team to Hidalgo, Texas, and took on the identity of the Rio Grande Valley Killer Bees. The team eventually relocated to Pennsylvania after only two seasons. In 2018, another junior level Killer Bees was announced as part of the USA Central Hockey League starting in October 2018, but the league folded after six weeks of operation.

Team record

Retired numbers

Franchise leaders

Games Played (Top 5)

Goals (Top 5)

Assists (Top 5)

Points (Top 5)

Penalty Minutes (Top 5)

Games Played (Top 5 Goalies)

Wins (Top 5 Goalies)

Shutouts (Top 5 Goalies)

Goals Against Average (Top 5 Goalies)

Save Percentage (Top 5 Goalies)

Note: GP = Games played; G = Goals; A = Assists; P = Points; PIM=Penalties in minutes; MIN = Minutes played; W = Wins; L = Losses; T = Ties; SO = Shutouts; GA = Goals against; GAA = Goals against average; SV = Saves; SV% = Save percentage; SEASONS = What seasons were played with the Bees; YRS = Number of years with the Bees; * = The CHL penalized the Killer Bees by removing two points

Notes

External links
NAHL Rio Grande Valley Killer Bees website (former site of the CHL team)

Defunct Central Hockey League teams
Ice hockey teams in Texas
Defunct ice hockey teams in Texas
Ice hockey clubs established in 2003
Sports clubs disestablished in 2012
Sports in the Rio Grande Valley
2003 establishments in Texas
2012 disestablishments in Texas
Hidalgo County, Texas